MicroPlace was an American microfinance provider that focused on retail investors.  Started by Tracey Pettengill Turner in 2006, MicroPlace was bought out by eBay that same year.

MicroPlace provided everyday investors with the ability to make investments in the microfinance industry that had the potential to earn interest. This contrasts with most other services for microlenders, which generally rely on a charitable model. Interest earned was typically between 1 and 3 percent.

The company acted as a broker-dealer and is registered with the SEC and is a member of FINRA.

History
MicroPlace was founded by Tracey Pettengill Turner and was bought by eBay for an undisclosed amount in 2006. Her hope is to expand the microfinancing industry from its current base of 100 million people to 1 billion people, with help from the middle class of affluent nations (the United States, European Union, etc.).

Ashwini Narayanan took over as the general manager of MicroPlace until 2012.

On January 14, 2014, MicroPlace announced that it would cease offering investments.

References

External links
MicroPlace website

EBay
Microfinance
Companies formerly listed on the Nasdaq